Marsalis is a surname. Notable people with the name include:

Arts and entertainment

Music
Branford Marsalis (born 1960), American saxophonist, composer and bandleader
Delfeayo Marsalis (born July 28, 1965), American jazz trombonist and record producer
Ellis Marsalis Jr. (1934–2020), American jazz pianist
Jason Marsalis (born 1977), American jazz drummer
Wynton Marsalis (born 1961), American trumpeter and composer

Other media
Amanda Marsalis, American film director and photographer

Other people
Ellis Marsalis Sr. (1908–2004), American businessman
Jim Marsalis (born 1945), American football player
John H. Marsalis (1904–1971), American politician
Thomas Marsalis (1852–1919), American developer

See also
Marselis, surname
Marcellus (name), given name and surname